Constantinos Papamichael (born September 6, 1993) is a Cypriot alpine skier. He competed for the 2014 Winter Olympics in the slalom and giant slalom events. In giant slalom race he finished 64th, almost 30 seconds behind the winner Ted Ligety.

He began alpine skiing at the age of nine first has qualified for the nation team at the age of thirteen. He participated in FIS Alpine World Ski Championships 2011 as well as the FIS Alpine World Ski Championships 2013. His best result at the FIS Alpine World Ski Championships is 45th place in the men's slalom competition in 2013 in Schladming.

He was chosen to be Cyprus' flag bearer at the opening ceremony of the 2014 Winter Olympics.

See also
 Sport in Cyprus
 Cyprus at the Olympics
 Cyprus at the 2014 Winter Olympics

References

1993 births
Living people
Cypriot male alpine skiers
Olympic alpine skiers of Cyprus
Alpine skiers at the 2014 Winter Olympics